Little John is an archaeological site in Yukon, Canada, located  northwest of the White River First Nation community of Beaver Creek, from which human artefacts and ancient animal bones have been radiocarbon dated to 14,000 years before present (BP), earlier than the generally accepted time for human migration into the Americas and one of the oldest sites in Beringia.

Context 
The Little John site lies at the edge of the Mirror Creek glacial advance (central Yukon's Reid, or North American Illinoian glacial events).

Dating 
The site was excavated by anthropologist Norman Alexander Easton between 2002 and 2017. Radiocarbon dating of one of the human butchered bison bones indicates that the site is between 13,720 and 14,050 years old.

See also 

 Bluefish Caves
 Beringia
 Old Crow Flats
 Pendejo Cave

References 

Archaeological sites in Yukon
Prehistory of the Arctic
Geography of Yukon
Pre-Clovis archaeological sites in the Americas